Wushu at the 2016 South Asian Games were held in Guwahati, India from 10 to 15 February 2016.

In men's Sanshou, India grabbed three gold with Uchit Sharma (52 kg), Ravi Panchal (56 kg), Surya Bhanu Pratap Singh (60 kg) emerging winners in their respective weight categories.

Pakistan's Ali Haider and Maaz Khan won a gold medal defeating Shekib Haidari of Afghanistan and Mukesh Choudhary (Wushu) of India in the 65 kg and 70 kg categories.

In the women's Sanshou event, Y. Sanathoi Devi (52 kg), Anupama Devi (60 kg), Puja Kadian (70 kg) emerged victorious grabbing all gold medals

Pakistan won two gold, two silver and six bronze medals while Nepal secured one gold, 10 silver and a bronze medal.

Medalists

Medal table

References

External links
Official website

2016 South Asian Games
Events at the 2016 South Asian Games
2016 in wushu (sport)
Wushu at the South Asian Games